Pickling is the process of preserving or extending the shelf life of food by either anaerobic fermentation in brine or immersion in vinegar. The pickling procedure typically affects the food's texture and flavor. The resulting food is called a pickle, or, to prevent ambiguity, prefaced with pickled. Foods that are pickled include vegetables, fruits, meats, fish, dairy and eggs.

Pickling solutions that are typically highly acidic, with a pH of 4.6 or lower, and high in salt, prevent enzymes from working and micro-organisms from multiplying. Pickling can preserve perishable foods for months. Antimicrobial herbs and spices, such as mustard seed, garlic, cinnamon or cloves, are often added. If the food contains sufficient moisture, a pickling brine may be produced simply by adding dry salt. For example, sauerkraut and Korean kimchi are produced by salting the vegetables to draw out excess water. Natural fermentation at room temperature, by lactic acid bacteria, produces the required acidity. Other pickles are made by placing vegetables in vinegar. Like the canning process, pickling (which includes fermentation) does not require that the food be completely sterile before it is sealed.  The acidity or salinity of the solution, the temperature of fermentation, and the exclusion of oxygen determine which microorganisms dominate, and determine the flavor of the end product.

When both salt concentration and temperature are low, Leuconostoc mesenteroides dominates, producing a mix of acids, alcohol, and aroma compounds.  At higher temperatures Lactobacillus plantarum dominates, which produces primarily lactic acid. Many pickles start with Leuconostoc, and change to Lactobacillus with higher acidity.

History
Pickling with vinegar likely originated in ancient Mesopotamia around 2400 BCE. There is archaeological evidence of cucumbers being pickled in the Tigris Valley in 2030 BCE. Pickling vegetables in vinegar continued to develop in the Middle East region before spreading to the Maghreb, to Sicily and to Spain. From Spain it spread to the Americas.

Pickling was used as a way to preserve food for out-of-season use and for long journeys, especially by sea. Salt pork and salt beef were common staples for sailors before the days of steam engines. Although the process was invented to preserve foods, pickles are also made and eaten because people enjoy the resulting flavors. Pickling may also improve the nutritional value of food by introducing B vitamins produced by bacteria.

Etymology
The English term "pickle" first appears around 1400. It is from Middle English pikel, a spicy sauce served with meat or fish, borrowed from Middle Dutch or Middle Low German pekel ("brine") but later referred to preserving brine or vinegar.

In world cuisines

Asia

South Asia

South Asia has a large variety of pickles (known as achar (अचार, اچار) in Nepali, Assamese, Bengali, Hindi (अचार), Punjabi, Gujarati, Urdu (اچار) uppinakaayi in Kannada, lonacha (लोणचं) in Marathi, uppilittathu or achar in Malayalam,   oorukai in Tamil, pacchadi or ooragaya in Telugu, which are mainly made from varieties of mango, lemon, lime, gongura (a sour leafy shrub), tamarind, Indian gooseberry (amla), and chilli. Vegetables such as eggplant, carrots, cauliflower, tomato, bitter gourd, green tamarind, ginger, garlic, onion, and citron are also occasionally used. These fruits and vegetables are mixed with ingredients like salt, spices, and vegetable oils. The pickling process is completed by placing filled jars in the sun where they mature in the sun. The sun's heat destroys moulds and microbes which could spoil the pickles.

In Pakistan, pickles are known locally as achaar (in Urdu اچار) and come in a variety of flavours. A popular item is the traditional mixed Hyderabadi pickle, a common delicacy prepared from an assortment of fruits (most notably mangoes) and vegetables blended with selected spices. Although the origin of the word is ambiguous, the word āchār is widely considered to be of Persian origin. Āchār in Persian is defined as ‘powdered or salted meats, pickles, or fruits, preserved in salt, vinegar, honey, sugar or syrup.'

In Sri Lanka, a date and shallot pickle achcharu is traditionally prepared from carrots, chilli powder, shallots and ground dates mixed with garlic, crushed fresh ginger, green chilis, mustard seeds and vinegar, and left to sit in a clay pot.

Indian pickles are mostly prepared in three ways: salt/brine, oil, and vinegar, with mango pickle being most popular among all.

Southeast Asia

Singapore, Indonesian and Malaysian pickles, called acar are typically made out of cucumber, carrot, bird's eye chilies, and shallots, these items being seasoned with vinegar, sugar and salt. Fruits, such as papaya and pineapple, are also sometimes pickled.

In the Philippines, pickling is a common method of preserving food, with many commonly eaten foods pickled, traditionally done using large earthen jars. The process is known as buro or binuro. Pickling was a common method of preserving a large variety of foods like fish throughout the archipelago before the advent of refrigeration, but its popularity is now confined to vegetables and fruits. Atchara is primarily made out of julienned green papaya, carrots, and shallots, seasoned with cloves of garlic and vinegar; but could include ginger, bell peppers, white radishes, cucumbers or bamboo shoots. Pickled unripe mangoes or burong mangga, unripe tomatoes, guavas, jicama, bitter gourd and other fruit and vegetables still retain their appeal. Siling labuyo, sometimes with garlic and red onions, is also pickled in bottled vinegar and is a staple condiment in Filipino cuisine.

In Burma, tea leaves are pickled to produce lahpet, which has strong social and cultural importance.

East Asia
A wide variety of foods are pickled throughout East Asia. The pickles are often sweet, salty, and/or spicy and preserved in sweetened solutions or oil.

China is home to a huge variety of pickled vegetables, including radish, baicai (Chinese cabbage, notably suan cai, pao cai, and Tianjin preserved vegetable), zha cai, chili pepper (e.g. duo jiao), and cucumbers, among many others.

Japanese tsukemono (pickled foods) include takuan (daikon), umeboshi (ume plum), tataki gobo (burdock root), gari & beni shōga (ginger), turnip, cucumber, and Chinese cabbage.

The Korean staple kimchi is usually made from pickled napa cabbage and radish, but is also made from green onions, garlic stems, chives and a host of other vegetables. Jangajji is another banchan consisting of pickled vegetables.

Western Asia 

In Iran, Turkey, Arab countries, the Balkans, and the South Caucasus, pickles (called torshi in Persian, turşu in Turkish language and mekhallel in Arabic) are commonly made from turnips, peppers, carrots, green olives, cucumbers, eggplants, cabbage, green tomatoes, lemons, and cauliflower.

Sauerkraut, as well as cabbage pickled in vinegar, with carrot and other vegetables is commonly consumed as a kosher dish in Israel and is considered pareve, meaning that it contains no meat or dairy so it can be consumed with either.

Europe

Central and Eastern Europe

In Hungary, the main meal (lunch) usually includes some kind of pickles (savanyúság), but pickles are also commonly consumed at other times of the day. The most commonly consumed pickles are sauerkraut (savanyú káposzta), pickled cucumbers and peppers, and csalamádé, but tomatoes, carrots, beetroot, baby corn, onions, garlic, certain squashes and melons, and a few fruits like plums and apples are used to make pickles too. Stuffed pickles are specialties, usually made of peppers or melons pickled after being stuffed with a cabbage filling. Pickled plum stuffed with garlic is a unique Hungarian type of pickle just like csalamádé and leavened cucumber (kovászos uborka). Csalamádé is a type of mixed pickle made of cabbage, cucumber, paprika, onion, carrot, tomatoes, and bay leaf mixed up with vinegar as the fermenting agent. Leavened cucumber, unlike other types of pickled cucumbers that are around all year long, is rather a seasonal pickle produced in the summer. Cucumbers, spices, herbs, and slices of bread are put in a glass jar with salt water and kept in direct sunlight for a few days. The yeast from the bread, along with other pickling agents and spices fermented under the hot sun, give the cucumbers a unique flavor, texture, and slight carbonation. Its juice can be used instead of carbonated water to make a special type of spritzer ('Újházy fröccs').
It is common for Hungarian households to produce their own pickles. Different regions or towns have their special recipes unique to them. Among them all, the Vecsési sauerkraut (Vecsési savanyú káposzta) is the most famous.

 

Romanian pickles (murături) are made out of beetroot, cucumbers, green tomatoes (gogonele), carrots, cabbage, garlic, sauerkraut (bell peppers stuffed with cabbage), bell peppers, melons, mushrooms, turnips, celery and cauliflower. Meat, like pork, can also be preserved in salt and lard.

Polish, Czech and Slovak traditional pickles are cucumbers, sauerkraut, peppers, beetroot, tomatoes, but other pickled fruits and vegetables, including plums, pumpkins and mushrooms are also common.

North Caucasian, Russian, Ukrainian and Belarusian pickled items include beets, mushrooms, tomatoes, sauerkraut, cucumbers, ramsons, garlic, eggplant (which is typically stuffed with julienned carrots), custard squash, and watermelon. Garden produce is commonly pickled using salt, dill, blackcurrant leaves, bay leaves and garlic and is stored in a cool, dark place. The leftover brine (called rassol (рассол) in Russian) has a number of culinary uses in these countries, especially for cooking traditional soups, such as shchi, rassolnik, and solyanka. Rassol, especially cucumber or sauerkraut rassol, is also a favorite traditional remedy against morning hangover.

Southern Europe

An Italian pickled vegetable dish is giardiniera, which includes onions, carrots, celery and cauliflower. Many places in southern Italy, particularly in Sicily, pickle eggplants and hot peppers.

In Albania, Bulgaria, Serbia, North Macedonia and Turkey, mixed pickles, known as turshi, tursija or turshu form popular appetizers, which are typically eaten with rakia. Pickled green tomatoes, cucumbers, carrots, bell peppers, peppers, eggplants, and sauerkraut are also popular.

Turkish pickles, called turşu, are made out of vegetables, roots, and fruits such as peppers, cucumber, Armenian cucumber, cabbage, tomato, eggplant (aubergine), carrot, turnip, beetroot, green almond, baby watermelon, baby cantaloupe, garlic, cauliflower, bean and green plum. A mixture of spices flavor the pickles.

In Greece, pickles, called τουρσί(α), are made out of carrots, celery, eggplants stuffed with diced carrots, cauliflower, tomatoes, and peppers.

In Spain, pickles, known as "encurtidos", are mainly made with olives, cucumbers, onions and green peppers ("guindillas" or "piparras"). "Banderillas" are small pieces of pickled cucumber and green pepper, along with olives and anchovies, mounted into  toothpicks, and are very popular as Tapas.

Northern Europe
In Britain, pickled onions and pickled eggs are often sold in pubs and fish and chip shops. Pickled beetroot, walnuts, and gherkins, and condiments such as Branston Pickle and piccalilli are typically eaten as an accompaniment to pork pies and cold meats, sandwiches or a ploughman's lunch. Other popular pickles in the UK are pickled mussels, cockles, red cabbage, mango chutney, sauerkraut, and olives. Rollmops are also quite widely available under a range of names from various producers both within and out of the UK.

Pickled herring, rollmops, and salmon are popular in Scandinavia. Pickled cucumbers and red garden beets are important as condiments for several traditional dishes. Pickled capers are also common in Scandinavian cuisine.

North America

In the United States and Canada, pickled cucumbers (most often referred to simply as "pickles"), olives, and sauerkraut are most commonly seen, although pickles common in other nations are also very widely available. In Canada and the US, there may be a distinction made between gherkins (usually smaller), and pickles (larger pickled cucumbers).

Sweet pickles made with fruit are more common in the cuisine of the American South. The pickling "syrup" is made with vinegar, brown sugar, and whole spices such as cinnamon sticks, allspice and cloves. Fruit pickles can be made with an assortment of fruits including watermelon, cantaloupe, Concord grapes and peaches.

Canadian pickling is similar to that of Britain. Through the winter, pickling is an important method of food preservation. Pickled cucumbers, onions, and eggs are common. Pickled egg and pickled sausage make popular pub snacks in much of English Canada. Chow-chow is a tart vegetable mix popular in the Maritime Provinces and the Southern United States, similar to piccalilli. Pickled fish is commonly seen, as in Scotland, and kippers may be seen for breakfast, as well as plentiful smoked salmon. Meat is often also pickled or preserved in different brines throughout the winter, most prominently in the harsh climate of Newfoundland.

Pickled eggs are common in many regions of the United States. Pickled herring is available in the Upper Midwest. Giardiniera, a mixture of pickled peppers, celery and olives, is a popular condiment in Chicago and other Midwestern cities with large Italian-American populations, and is often consumed with Italian beef sandwiches.

Pennsylvania Dutch Country has a strong tradition of pickled foods, including chow-chow and red beet eggs. In the Southern United States, pickled okra and watermelon rind are popular, as are deep-fried pickles and pickled pig's feet, pickled chicken eggs, pickled quail eggs, pickled garden vegetables and pickled sausage.

Various pickled vegetables, fish, or eggs may make a side dish to a Canadian lunch or dinner. Popular pickles in the Pacific Northwest include pickled asparagus and green beans. Pickled fruits like blueberries and early green strawberries are paired with meat dishes in restaurants.

Thanksgiving

Pickles were part of Thanksgiving dinner traditions as early as 1827. The first mention of pickles at Thanksgiving comes from Sarah Josepha Hale's novel Northwood. (Hale is best known for her successful campaign to have Thanksgiving recognized as a national holiday in the United States.) Pickled peaches, coleslaw and other mixed pickles continue to be served alongside cranberry sauce at Thanksgiving dinner in present times.

Mexico, Central America, and South America
In Mexico, chili peppers, particularly of the Jalapeño and serrano varieties, pickled with onions, carrots and herbs form common condiments.

In the Mesoamerican region, pickling is known as encurtido or "curtido" for short. The pickles or "curtidos" as known in Latin America are served cold, as an appetizer, as a side dish or as a tapas dish in Spain. In several Central American countries it is prepared with cabbage, onions, carrots, lemon, vinegar, oregano, and salt. In Mexico, "curtido" consists of carrots, onions, and jalapeño peppers and used to accompany meals common in taquerías and restaurants.

Another example of a type of pickling which involves the pickling of meats or seafood is the "escabeche" or "ceviches" popular in Peru, Ecuador, and throughout Latin America and the Caribbean. These dishes include the pickling of pig's feet, pig's ears, and gizzards prepared as an "escabeche" with spices and seasonings to flavor it. The ceviches consist of shrimp, octopus, and various fishes seasoned and served cold.

Process

In traditional pickling, fruit or vegetables are submerged in brine (20–40 grams/L of salt (3.2–6.4 oz/imp gal or 2.7–5.3 oz/US gal)), or shredded and salted as in sauerkraut preparation, and held underwater by flat stones layered on top. Alternatively, a lid with an airtrap or a tight lid may be used if the lid is able to release pressure which may result from carbon dioxide buildup. Mold or (white) kahm yeast may form on the surface; kahm yeast is mostly harmless but can impart an off taste and may be removed without affecting the pickling process.

In chemical pickling, the fruits or vegetables to be pickled are placed in a sterilized jar along with brine, vinegar, or both, as well as spices, and are then allowed to mature until the desired taste is obtained.

The food can be pre-soaked in brine before transferring to vinegar. This reduces the water content of the food, which would otherwise dilute the vinegar. This method is particularly useful for fruit and vegetables with a high natural water content.

In commercial pickling, a preservative such as sodium benzoate or EDTA may also be added to enhance shelf life.  In fermentation pickling, the food itself produces the preservation agent, typically by a process involving Lactobacillus bacteria that produce lactic acid as the preservative agent.

Alum, short for aluminum sulfate, is used in pickling to promote crisp texture and is approved, though not recommended, as a food additive by the United States Food and Drug Administration. Another common crisping agent is calcium chloride, which evolved from the practice of using pickling lime. See also firming agent.

"Refrigerator pickles" are unfermented pickles made by marinating fruit or vegetables in a seasoned vinegar solution. They must be stored under refrigeration or undergo canning to achieve long-term storage.

Japanese Tsukemono use a variety of pickling ingredients depending on their type, and are produced by combining these ingredients with the vegetables to be preserved and putting the mixture under pressure.

Possible health hazards of pickled vegetables
The World Health Organization has listed pickled vegetables as a possible carcinogen, and the British Journal of Cancer released an online 2009 meta-analysis of research on pickles as increasing the risks of esophageal cancer. The report, citing limited data in a statistical meta analysis, indicates a potential two-fold increased risk of oesophageal cancer associated with Asian pickled vegetable consumption. Results from the research are described as having "high heterogeneity" and the study said that further well-designed prospective studies were warranted. However, their results stated "The majority of subgroup analyses showed a statistically significant association between consuming pickled vegetables and Oesophageal Squamous Cell Carcinoma".

The 2009 meta-analysis reported heavy infestation of pickled vegetables with fungi. Some common fungi can facilitate the formation of N-nitroso compounds, which are strong oesophageal carcinogens in several animal models. Roussin red methyl ester, a non-alkylating nitroso compound with tumour-promoting effect in vitro, was identified in pickles from Linzhou, Henan (formerly Linxian) in much higher concentrations than in samples from low-incidence areas. Fumonisin mycotoxins have been shown to cause liver and kidney tumours in rodents.

A 2017 study in Chinese Journal of Cancer has linked salted vegetables ( common among Chinese cuisine) to a fourfold increase in nasopharynx cancer. The researchers believe possible mechanisms include production of nitrosamines (a type of N-nitroso compound) by fermentation and activation of Epstein–Barr virus by fermentation products.

Historically, pickling caused health concerns for reasons associated with copper salts, as explained in the mid-19th century The English and Australian Cookery Book: "The evidence of the Lancet commissioner (Dr. Hassall) and Mr. Blackwell (of the eminent firm of Crosse and Blackwell) went to prove that the pickles sold in the shops are nearly always artificially coloured, and are thus rendered highly unwholesome, if not actually poisonous."

Risk reduction 
Reduction of suspected carcinogens from pickled products is a subject of active research.

 Fungi are of interest both for spoilage prevention and reduction of mycotoxins. Some pickle cultures are said to contain bacteria producing natural antifungals.
 Nitrites, responsible for the creation of N-nitroso compounds, is reduced by low pH and/or high temperature. Inclusion of a porcini enzyme (or the whole mushroom) also reduces nitrite content.

Gallery

See also 

 
 Curing (food preservation)
 
 
 
 
 
 Smoking (cooking)

References

External links

 Fermented Fruits and Vegetables: A Global Perspective—Food and Agriculture Organization of the United Nations
 National Center for Home Food Preservation: How do I...Pickle
 Pickles at h2g2

 
Food preservation
Cooking techniques
World cuisine
Culinary terminology
Thanksgiving food